JDS Sachishio (SS-582) was a. She was commissioned on 24 March 1989.

Construction and career
Sachishio was laid down at Kawasaki Heavy Industries Kobe Shipyard on 11 April 1986 and launched on 17 February 1988. She was commissioned on 24 March 1989, into the 2nd Submarine Group in Yokosuka.

Participated in Hawaii dispatch training from August 8 to November 28, 1990.

She participated in Hawaii dispatch training from January 18 to April 20, 1993.

On 4 March 2003, she was transferred as the 6th submarine (Yokosuka) of the 2nd Submarine Group.

In December 2007, she was dismantled at Etajima.

Citations

1988 ships
Yūshio-class submarines
Ships built by Kawasaki Heavy Industries